Chittur-Thathamangalam is a town and municipality in Palakkad district of Kerala State, India. It was once part of the former Kingdom of Cochin. The municipality consists of Chittur, Thathamangalam, Pallimokku, Kannanthara, Puzhampalam, Kacherimedu, Anicode, Thekkegramam and Kadambidi.

Temples
Chittur-Thathamangalam town consists of the famous Chittur Bhagavathi temple, which is under the Cochin Devaswom board. The other major temples are the Pazhayannur Bhagavathi temple, Durga temple, and Sivakshethram (in Lankeswaram agraharam).

Economy and Society
Agriculture is the main occupation of the district's people. The town is home to some of the major Menon tharavads of Kerala. There are also many agraharams (communities of Iyers) and Moothan communities.

History
The Sokanashini river flows through Chittur, and it is on the banks of this river that Thunjathu Ramanujan Ezuthachan, the father of the Malayalam language, spent his last days. His final resting place is famous for Vidyarambham celebrations, where young children are initiated into the world of words and knowledge.

Chittur was formerly a military cantonment.

Thathamangalam is sometimes mentioned in history books and maps as Tattamungalum.

Chittur, Thathamangalam and nearby towns are also mentioned in "Memoir of the Survey of Travancore and Cochin 1816-1820", and in this book the spelling used is "Tattamungalum".

Festivals
Music is a part of the lifestyle of the people here, with the Government College training students towards higher degrees in music. 
Kongan Pada is the main festival of Chittur, and it is celebrated in the month of March. Sooranporu, Niramala and Ayyappan Vilakku are also celebrated here. Others include Onam, Pongal, Vishu, Deepavali and Navarathri. At the time of Vishu, Vishu Vela is also celebrated. There are music concerts in Chittur Kavu at the time of Navarathri and Konganpada. Other than these, there is an important festival in Lankeswaram village, called Ardra Dharsanam (Thiruvathira Radholsavam), at the end of December or first of January month every year.

Demographics
 India census, Chittur-Thathamangalam had a population of 31,884. Males constitute 49% of the population and females 51%.

Chittur-Thathamangalam has an average literacy rate of 79%, higher than the national average of 59.5%; with male literacy of 84% and female literacy of 74%. 9% of the population is under 6 years of age. Chittur is sometimes called as Kerala's "nellara" along with Alappuzha, meaning the rice bowl.

Transportation
Chittur-Thathamangalam town connects to other parts of India through Palakkad city.  National Highway 544 connects to Coimbatore and Bangalore.  Other parts of Kerala are accessed through National Highway 66 going through Thrissur.  The nearest major railway station is Palakkad.  The nearest airport is Coimbatore.

Chittur Taluk
The headquarters of Chittur Taluk, one of the six taluks of Palakkad district, is here. Chittur's MLA is K. Krishnan Kutty of Janata Dal (Secular).

References

Cities and towns in Palakkad district

bn:চিত্তুর-থাথমঙ্গলম
bpy:চিত্তুর-থাথমঙ্গলম
new:चित्तुर-थाथमङ्गलम
vi:Chittur-Thathamangalam